The Women's Sprint was one of the 9 women's events at the 2010 UCI Track Cycling World Championships, held in Ballerup, Denmark.

27 cyclists from  14 countries participated in the contest. After the qualifying heats, the fastest 24 riders were to advance to the 1/16 finals.

The first rider in each of the 12 heats advanced to the second round. There was no repechage for this round.

The first rider from each of the six Second Round heats advanced to the Quarterfinals and the second placed riders from a repechage to determine the other two riders that competed the quarterfinals.

The first rider in each quarterfinal advanced to the semifinals and the 4 losing athletes faced a race for 5th-8th place.

The qualifying, first round, second round, second round repechages and quarterfinals took place on 26 March. The Semifinals and Finals took place on 27 March.

World record

Results

Qualifying

1/16 Finals

1/8 Finals

1/8 Finals Repechage

Quarterfinals

Race for 5th-8th Places

Semifinals

Finals

References

Qualifying Results
1/16 Finals Results
1/8 Finals Results
1/8 Repechage Finals Results
Quarterfinals Results
Race for 5th-8th Places Results
Semifinals Results
Finals Results

Women's sprint
UCI Track Cycling World Championships – Women's sprint